Marganus II (Welsh: Morgan mab Arthal) was a legendary king of the Britons as recounted by Geoffrey of Monmouth. He was the son of King Archgallo and was succeeded by his brother, Enniaunus. He ruled the kingdom in tranquility and without conflict.

References

Legendary British kings
3rd-century BC rulers